Selvagem? (Portuguese for "Savage?") is the third studio album by Brazilian rock band Os Paralamas do Sucesso. It was released in 1986. "Você" is a cover of Tim Maia. Commenting on the track "Selvagem" in 2013, amidst the 2013 protests in Brazil, bassist Bi Ribeiro said he was impressed that the song was still in harmony with Brazilian conjuncture.

Cover
The album cover, designed by Ricardo Leite, depicts bassist Bi Ribeiro's brother, Pedro Ribeiro, in a camp at a cerrado area near Brasília, now occupied by a residential condominium. The picture was taken after one week of no shower and limited food. Each camper dressed like a character and Pedro chose to be a "savage", wearing a judo belt and holding a bow given by a native Brazilian and with which they intended to hunt some birds. It was then hung upon a wall in the room where the band used to rehearse at the brothers' grandmother house, near posters of musicians like Alceu Valença, Jimi Hendrix and others.

Even before any song was composed, the band already knew that would be the cover and the character's name would be the title, even though the label was initially reluctant. According to Bi, the objective was "to challenge, provoke, show independence and that we could do what we wanted to do".

Track listing

Legacy
Selvagem? was ranked 39th at Rolling Stone Brasil's list of 100 Best Albums of Brazilian Music.

Personnel
 Bi Ribeiro — bass
 Herbert Vianna — guitar, vocals
 João Barone — drums, percussion, dialog in "Melô do Marinheiro"

Additional musicians
 Liminha — keyboards on tracks 1–3, 10, guitar on track 1, phaser on track 1
 Gilberto Gil  — vocals on track 1
 Armando Marçal  — percussion on tracks 1,2,10

References 

1986 albums
Os Paralamas do Sucesso albums
EMI Records albums
Albums produced by Liminha